The Rural Municipality of Spy Hill No. 152 is a rural municipality (RM) in the Canadian province of Saskatchewan within Census Division No. 5 and  Division No. 1. It is located in the east-central portion of the province.

History 
The RM of Spy Hill No. 152 incorporated as a rural municipality on December 11, 1911. It was previously established as a local improvement district on January 3, 1910.

Heritage properties
There is one heritage building located within the RM.

Voysey Farmhouse Site, constructed in 1917, is representative of an early farm settlement of the period

Demographics 

Carlton Trail Regional Park 
The origins of the park began in the 1950s when John From, a local land owner and professional landscaper, built a summer park for local residents. He dug two artificial lakes, built a golf course, and added a campground. In 1972, John From sold the park to the Regional Park Authority. Carlton Trail Regional Park is located along the Carlton Trail, which was a 19th century trail that linked Fort Garry with Fort Edmonton.

The park is a family recreation and activity centre that features a 9-hole golf course, 9-hole disk golf course, two campgrounds, a group campsite, two man-made lakes, ball diamonds, food services, and hiking trails. The campgrounds have a total of 129 campsites with fire pits, potable water, picnic tables, washrooms, and showers. Swimming Lake–the smaller of the lakes–has a large beach, picnic area, and playground. The other lake, From Lake, is a 12-acre lake that is stocked for anglers. Only electric boats and canoes are allowed on the lake.

The golf course is a grass greens, 9-hole course. There's a licensed club house, pro-shop, and restaurant. The white tees are 3,055 yards with a par of 36 and red tees are 2,935 yards with a par of 37.

Government 
The RM of Spy Hill No. 152 is governed by an elected municipal council and an appointed administrator that meets on the second Thursday of every month. The reeve of the RM is Bob Bruce while its administrator is Carey Nicholauson. The RM's office is located in Spy Hill.

See also 
List of rural municipalities in Saskatchewan

References 

Spy Hill
 
Division No. 5, Saskatchewan